Los Bermejales Reservoir is a reservoir in Arenas del Rey, province of Granada, Andalusia, Spain.
It is fed by streams from the Sierra de Almijara mountains in the Sierras of Tejeda, Almijara and Alhama Natural Park and is the source of the Cacín River.

See also 
 List of reservoirs and dams in Andalusia

External links 
 Agencia del agua Junta de Andalucía 
 Reservoirs status summary 
 Confederación Hidrográfica del Guadalquivir 

Reservoirs in Andalusia